Kazuhiro Yamakura (山倉 和博, born September 2, 1955) is a Japanese former professional baseball catcher. He spent his entire 13-year playing career with the Yomiuri Giants of Nippon Professional Baseball.

He was the 1987 Central League MVP.

References

1955 births
Living people
People from Ōbu, Aichi
Baseball people from Aichi Prefecture
Waseda University alumni
Japanese baseball players
Nippon Professional Baseball catchers
Yomiuri Giants players
Nippon Professional Baseball MVP Award winners
Japanese baseball coaches
Nippon Professional Baseball coaches